William Albert Boyd Douglas (10 January 1923 – 17 May 2013) was a unionist politician in Northern Ireland.

Douglas worked as a farmer and served as a flight lieutenant in the Royal Air Force during World War II.  He rose to prominence as Limavady District Master in the Orange Order, leading protests against the civil rights movement, and organising loyalist demonstrations in Dungiven.

Douglas was also active in the Ulster Unionist Party.  From 1960 to 1973, he served on Limavady Rural District Council.  He was then elected in Londonderry for the Ulster Unionist Party at the 1973 Northern Ireland Assembly election, and held his seat on the Constitutional Convention and at the 1982 Assembly, at which he served as Ulster Unionist Chief Whip.  He strongly opposed the Good Friday Agreement.

Douglas' son, known as Boyd Douglas, also became a politician.

References

1923 births
2013 deaths
Councillors in County Londonderry
Members of the Northern Ireland Assembly 1973–1974
Members of the Northern Ireland Constitutional Convention
Northern Ireland MPAs 1982–1986
People from Limavady
Royal Air Force officers
Ulster Unionist Party councillors
Royal Air Force personnel of World War II